Georgios Giannoutsos (born 16 July 1998) is a Greek professional footballer who plays as a left-back for Cypriot Second Division club Peyia 2014.

Career

AEK Athens
On 26 August 2016, Giannoutsos signed a professional contract with AEK Athens, until the summer of 2020.

Loan to Alki Oroklini
On 21 July 2019, Giannoutsos was loaned out at Alki Oroklini.

Career statistics

Honours
AEK Athens
Superleague: 2017–18

References

External links
 

1998 births
Living people
Greek footballers
Greek expatriate footballers
Greece youth international footballers
AEK Athens F.C. players
Alki Oroklini players
Episkopi F.C. players
Association football fullbacks
Super League Greece players
Cypriot Second Division players
Super League Greece 2 players
Footballers from Central Greece
People from Euboea (regional unit)